Kenneth Salen is a Norwegian sport shooter, who is a three-time IPSC Norwegian Rifle Championship Champion (2014, 2015, 2016) and three time IPSC Norwegian Tournament Championship Champion (2014, 2015, 2016).

References 

IPSC shooters
Norwegian male sport shooters
Living people
Year of birth missing (living people)
Place of birth missing (living people)
21st-century Norwegian people